State Fair (1933) is an American pre-Code comedy-drama film directed by Henry King and starring Janet Gaynor, Will Rogers, and Lew Ayres. The picture tells the story of a farm family's multi-day visit to the Iowa State Fair, where the parents seek to win prizes in agricultural and cooking competitions, and their teenage daughter and son each find unexpected romance. Based on the bestselling 1932 novel by Phil Stong, this was the first of three film versions of the novel released to theaters, the others being the movie musicals State Fair (1945) starring Jeanne Crain and Dana Andrews, and State Fair (1962) starring Ann-Margret and Pat Boone.

The 1933 version was nominated for an Academy Award for Best Picture. The film, made pre-Code and despite its seemingly tame plot, has some scenes that were censored a few years later, when it was re-released due to the Breen Office's Production Code that took effect in 1934. One scene that was cut showed a disheveled bed and a negligee on the floor while Norman Foster and Sally Eilers are heard speaking off-screen. Additionally, a sexual relationship between the daughter and a reporter was eliminated in the adaptation, however the son's seduction by a trapeze artist was kept.

Rogers was accorded top billing on some posters, but Gaynor was billed above Rogers in the film itself.

Victor Jory also appears as the hoop toss barker at the carnival, at the beginning of a screen career spanning 57 years.

In 2014, State Fair was deemed "culturally, historically, or aesthetically significant" by the Library of Congress and selected for preservation in the National Film Registry.

Cast
 Janet Gaynor as Margy Frake
 Will Rogers as Abel Frake
 Lew Ayres as Pat Gilbert
 Sally Eilers as Emily Joyce
 Norman Foster as Wayne Frake
 Louise Dresser as Melissa Frake
 Frank Craven as Storekeeper
 Victor Jory as Hoop Toss Barker
 Frank Melton as Harry Ware
 Erville Alderson as Martin (uncredited) 
 Hobart Cavanaugh as Professor Fred Coin (uncredited) 
 Harry Holman as Professor Tyler Cramp (uncredited)

References

External links
State Fair essay  by Aubrey Solomon at National Film Registry
Flyrope.com page (stage version)
  (1933 version)
 
 
 
 
 State Fair on Theatre Guild on the Air: January 4, 1953
 State Fair at Theatre Guild on the Air December 31, 1950

1933 films
1933 comedy-drama films
American black-and-white films
American comedy-drama films
Films based on American novels
Films directed by Henry King
Films set in Iowa
Fox Film films
Films with screenplays by Sonya Levien
United States National Film Registry films
State Fair (franchise)
1930s American films